Sperm flagellar protein 2 is a protein that in humans is encoded by the SPEF2 gene.

SPEF2 plays an important role in spermatogenesis and flagellar assembly. SPEF2 is expressed in all ciliated cells and is required for cilia function.  Sperm contain cilia, and a mutation in the SPEF2 gene can cause male infertility due to immobile sperm. In a pig animal model, a SPEF2 mutation affects the sperm tail development. And a loss of function mutation in SPEF2 in mice causes the big giant head phenotype. SPEF2 mRNA and protein products are localized in germ and sertoli cells.  Within these cells, SPEF2 is localized in the golgi complex, manchette, basal body and mid piece of the sperm tail.  SPEF2 has been shown to interact with the intracellular transport protein IFT20 in the testis.

References

Further reading